Cortachy is a village in Angus, Scotland. It lies in at the mouth of Glen Clova, on the River South Esk, four miles north of Kirriemuir. Nearby lies Cortachy Castle, seat of the Earls of Airlie.

References

Villages in Angus, Scotland